Harris Township is one of thirteen townships in St. Joseph County, in the U.S. state of Indiana. As of the 2000 census, its population was 19,873.

Harris Township was organized in 1836. The township was named after the Harris family, a local family of pioneer settlers.

Geography

Cities, towns, villages
 Mishawaka (partial)

CDPs
 CDP of Granger, Indiana (partial)

Cemeteries
The township contains Harris Prairie Cemetery on Adams Road, and Salem Cemetery near Ash and Brummitt Roads.

Major highways
  Interstate 80
  Interstate 90
  Indiana State Road 23

Airports and landing strips
 Cam-Air Airport
 Foos Field

Education
 Penn-Harris-Madison School Corporation

Harris Township residents may obtain a free library card from any branch of the Mishawaka-Penn-Harris Public Library system.

Political districts
 Indiana's 2nd congressional district
 State House District 48
 State House District 8
 State Senate District 11

References
 United States Census Bureau 2008 TIGER/Line Shapefiles
 United States Board on Geographic Names (GNIS)
 IndianaMap

External links
 Indiana Township Association
 United Township Association of Indiana
  Harris Township, St. Joseph County, Indiana

Townships in St. Joseph County, Indiana
South Bend – Mishawaka metropolitan area
Townships in Indiana